The Pyraminx is a regular tetrahedron puzzle in the style of Rubik's Cube. It was made and patented by Uwe Mèffert after the original 3 layered Rubik's Cube by Ernő Rubik, and introduced by Tomy Toys of Japan (then the 3rd largest toy company in the world) in 1981.

Description 

The Pyraminx was first conceived by Mèffert in 1970.  He did nothing with his design until 1981 when he first brought it to Hong Kong for production.  Uwe is fond of saying had it not been for Ernő Rubik's invention of the cube, his Pyraminx would have never been produced.

The Pyraminx is a puzzle in the shape of a regular tetrahedron, divided into 4 axial pieces, 6 edge pieces, and 4 trivial tips. It can be twisted along its cuts to permute its pieces. The axial pieces are octahedral in shape, although this is not immediately obvious, and can only rotate around the axis they are attached to. The 6 edge pieces can be freely permuted. The trivial tips are so called because they can be twisted independently of all other pieces, making them trivial to place in solved position. Meffert also produces a similar puzzle called the Tetraminx, which is the same as the Pyraminx except that the trivial tips are removed, turning the puzzle into a truncated tetrahedron.

The purpose of the Pyraminx is to scramble the colors, and then restore them to their original configuration.

The 4 trivial tips can be easily rotated to line up with the axial piece they are respectively attached to, and the axial pieces are also easily rotated so that their colors line up with each other. This leaves only the 6 edge pieces as a real challenge to the puzzle. They can be solved by repeatedly applying two 4-twist sequences, which are mirror-image versions of each other. These sequences permute 3 edge pieces at a time and change their orientation differently, so that a combination of both sequences is sufficient to solve the puzzle. However, more efficient solutions (requiring a smaller total number of twists) are generally available (see below).

The twist of any axial piece is independent of the other three, as is the case with the tips. The six edges can be placed in 6!/2 positions and flipped in 25 ways, accounting for parity. Multiplying this by the 38 factor for the axial pieces gives 75,582,720 possible positions. However, setting the trivial tips to the right positions reduces the possibilities to 933,120, which is also the number of possible patterns on the Tetraminx. Setting the axial pieces as well reduces the figure to only 11,520, making this a rather simple puzzle to solve.

Optimal solutions 

The maximum number of twists required to solve the Pyraminx is 11. There are 933,120 different positions (disregarding the trivial rotation of the tips), a number that is sufficiently small to allow a computer search for optimal solutions. The table below summarizes the result of such a search, stating the number p of positions that require n twists to solve the Pyraminx:

{| class="wikitable"
!n
|0||1||2 ||3  ||4   ||5   ||6    ||7     ||8     ||9     ||10  ||11
|-
!p
|1||8||48||288||1728||9896||51808||220111||480467||166276||2457||32
|}

Records 

The world record fastest Pyraminx solve is 0.75 seconds, set by Elijah Brown of United States on 21 January 2023 at Berkeley Winter A 2023. The world record fastest average of five Pyraminx solves (excluding fastest and slowest) is 1.66 seconds, set by Jasper Murray from New Zealand on 23rd April 2022 Twisty Taranaki 2022.

Top 6 solvers by single solve

Top 7 solvers by average of 5 solves

Methods 

There are many methods for solving a Pyraminx. They can be split up into two main groups.

1) V First Methods - In these methods, two or three edges are solved first, and a set of algorithms, also called LL (last layer) algorithms, are used to solve the remainder of the puzzle.

2) Top First Methods- In these methods, three edges around a center piece are solved first, and the remainder of the puzzle is solved using a set of algorithms.

Common V first methods-

a) Layer by Layer - In this method, a face with all edges permuted is solved, and then the remaining puzzle is solved by a single algorithm from a set of 5.

b) L4E - L4E or last 4 edges is somewhat similar to Layer by Layer. The only difference is that only two edges are solved around three centers, and the remaining four edges are solved using an algorithm.

c) Intuitive L4E - A method similar to the L4E, as the name suggests, in which a lot of visualization is required. The set of algorithms mentioned in the previous method is not memorized. In speedsolving, cases are solved intuitively by anticipating the movement of pieces. This is the most advanced V first method.

Common top first methods-

a) One Flip - This method uses two edges around one center solved and the third edge flipped. There are a total of six cases after this step, for which algorithms are memorized and executed. The third step involves using a common set of algorithms for all top first methods, also called Keyhole last layer, which involves 5 algorithms, four of them being the mirrors of each other.

b) Keyhole - This method uses two edges in the right place around one center, and the third edge placed elsewhere on the puzzle. The centers of the fourth color are then solved using the slot formed by the non-permuted edge. The last step is solved using Keyhole last layer algorithms.

c) OKA - In this method, one edge is oriented around two edges in the wrong place, but one of the edges that is in the wrong place belongs to the block itself. The last edge is found on the bottom layer, and a very simple algorithm is executed to get it in the right place, followed by keyhole last layer algorithms.

Some other common top first methods are WO and Nutella.

Many Pyraminx speedsolvers learn several methods, particularly top-first methods, and use the method that is best for the given solve.

There is no consensus among pyraminx speedsolvers regarding whether top-first or v-first methods are faster.

Variations

There are several variations of the puzzle. The simplest, Tetraminx, is equivalent to the (3x) Pyraminx but without the tips (see photo), resembling a truncated tetrahedron.  There also exist "higher-order" versions, such as the 4x Master Pyraminx (see photos) and the 5x Professor's Pyraminx.

The Master Pyraminx has 4 layers and 16 triangles-per-face (compared to 3 layers and 9 triangles-per-face of the original), and is based on the Skewb Diamond mechanism.  This version has about 2.6817 × 1015 combinations.  The Master Pyraminx has
 4 "tips" (same as the original Pyraminx)
 4 "middle axials"  (same as the original Pyraminx)
 4 "centers" (similar to Rubik's Cube, none in the original Pyraminx)
 6 "inner edges" (similar to Rubik's Cube, none in the original Pyraminx)
 12 "outer edges" (2-times more than the 6 of the original Pyraminx)
In summary, the Master Pyraminx has 30 "manipulable" pieces.  However, like the original, 8 of the pieces (the tips and middle axials) are fixed in position (relative to each other) and can only be rotated in place.  Also, the 4 centers are fixed in position and can only rotate (like the Rubik's Cube).  So there are only 18 (30-8-4) "truly movable" pieces; since this is 10% fewer than the 20 "truly movable" pieces of the Rubik's Cube, it should be no surprise that the Master Pyraminx has about 10,000-times fewer combinations than a Rubik's Cube (about 4.3252 × 1019).

Reviews
Games

See also 
Pyraminx Duo
Pyramorphix and Master Pyramorphix, two regular tetrahedron puzzles which resemble the Pyraminx but are mechanically very different from it
 Pocket Cube
 Rubik's Cube
 Rubik's Revenge
 Professor's Cube
 V-Cube 6
 V-Cube 7
 V-Cube 8
Skewb
Skewb Diamond
Megaminx
Dogic
Combination puzzles
Tower Cube

References

External links 

Jaap's Pyraminx and related puzzles page, with solution
Pyraminx solution from PuzzleSolver
 Pyraminx - ruwix.com (how to solve)
A solution to the Pyraminx by Jonathan Bowen
An efficient and easy to follow solution favoured by speed solvers
Patterns A collection of pretty patterns for the Pyraminx

1980s toys
Mechanical puzzles
Combination puzzles
Rubik's Cube